The 1978 United States Senate election in Alabama was held on November 7, 1978. Incumbent Democratic U.S. Senator John Sparkman decided to retire and Alabama Supreme Court Chief Justice Howell Heflin was elected to succeed him.

Heflin won the Democratic primary against Rep. Walter Flowers and faced only nominal opposition from Prohibition Party nominee Jerome Couch in the general election.

Democratic primary

Candidates
 John Baker, Alabama State Senator
 Walter Flowers, U.S. Representative
 Howell Heflin, former Chief Justice of the Alabama Supreme Court
 Mac Newton
 Margaret Stewart, perennial candidate
 Gordon Tucker
 Glenn Hewitt

Campaign
Prior to 1978, Alabama had never popularly elected any Senator from a party other than the Democratic Party, and Democratic candidates typically faced nominal opposition in the general election. Therefore, victory in the Democratic primary was considered tantamount to election.

Incumbent Democrat John Sparkman declined to seek a seventh consecutive term in office. Senator Sparkman retired as the longest-serving Senator in Alabama history.

Alabama Supreme Court Chief Justice Howell Heflin and Congressman Walter Flowers of Tuscaloosa were the leading candidates. Heflin came from a noted Alabama political family which included former Senator James Thomas Heflin, a famous advocate of white supremacy. Flowers was a strong ally of Governor George Wallace, a critic of President Carter, and had cast a crucial vote to impeach Richard Nixon, despite Nixon's strong support in the state.

During the campaign, Heflin attempted to tie himself to the late Senator James Allen. He was rebuffed by Allen's widow, Maryon, who succeeded her husband as Senator and supported Flowers. Maryon noted that Heflin worked for her husband's primary opponent during the 1974 campaign.

Results

Heflin and Flowers both proceeded to a run-off election, where Heflin won by over 250,000 votes.

Republican primary

Candidates

Withdrew
James D. Martin, former U.S. Representative for Alabama's 7th congressional district (to run in the special election)

After James Martin withdrew from the race to run in the concurrent special election to fill the late Senator Allen's seat, the Republican Party was left without a candidate for this election.

General election

Results

See also 
  1978 United States Senate elections
  1978 Alabama gubernatorial election

References 

1978 Alabama elections
Alabama
1978